Ghosts by César Aira was first published under the title Los fantasmas in 1990. Chris Andrews’s English translation was published by New Directions in 2009. It was nominated for the 2010 Best Translated Book Award shortlist.

Summary
Ghosts takes place in an unfinished luxury apartment complex in Buenos Aires that is shared by the night watchman's family, who live on the roof, and a cadre of ghosts who haunt its floors. While most of the construction workers and family members react to the ghosts with detachment, the family's teenage daughter becomes increasingly attracted by the specters. As the story progresses through New Year's Eve, the daughter's interest in the ghosts becomes more complex and nefarious, and ultimately threatens her life.

External links
"The Chris Andrews Interview," interview by Scott Bryan Wilson in The Quarterly Conversation, Summer 2007
"César Aira," by Maria Moreno in BOMB magazine, issue 106, Winter 2006
LibraryThing page for César Aira

References

Spanish fantasy novels
2009 fantasy novels
Novels set in Buenos Aires